Ferguson High School was a high school in Newport News, Virginia, United States. It is named for Homer L. Ferguson, who was president of Newport News Shipbuilding from July 22, 1915 until July 31, 1946. It was operated by Newport News Public Schools. The building opened as Warwick Junior High School in 1957 and became Ferguson High School in 1961.

The school closed in 1996, and was used by adjacent Christopher Newport University until the early 2000s. The former site of Ferguson High School on Warwick Boulevard is now the site of Ferguson Center for the Performing Arts, a theater and concert hall, on the campus of Christopher Newport University.

Notable alumni
 Larry Bethea, played for the Dallas Cowboys in the NFL
 Aaron Brooks, NFL player; played for the Green Bay Packers, New Orleans Saints, and the Oakland Raiders
 Patricia Goodson, concert pianist
 Dan Henning, former football coach at Ferguson; former head coach of the Atlanta Falcons (1983–1986), the San Diego Chargers (1989–1991) and of the Boston College Eagles (1994–96)
 C. Larry Pope, former President and CEO of Smithfield Foods
 Michael Vick, played for the Atlanta Falcons, Philadelphia Eagles, Pittsburgh Steelers, and New York Jets; attended Ferguson and transferred to Warwick High School in his sophomore year after Ferguson closed

References

Defunct schools in Virginia
Educational institutions established in 1957
Educational institutions disestablished in 1996
High schools in Newport News, Virginia
1957 establishments in Virginia